Andrew Whitelaw (19 May 1865 – 1938) was a Scottish footballer who played as a right back.

Career
Born in Jamestown, Whitelaw played club football for Vale of Leven, Notts County, Heanor Town and Leicester Fosse, and made two appearances for Scotland.

References

1868 births
1938 deaths
Scottish footballers
Scotland international footballers
Vale of Leven F.C. players
Notts County F.C. players
Heanor Town F.C. players
Leicester City F.C. players
Association football fullbacks
People from Alexandria, West Dunbartonshire
Footballers from West Dunbartonshire